Fred Cook (1858 – July 16, 1943) was mayor of Ottawa, Ontario, Canada, from 1902 to 1903.

He was born in Leeds, England, in 1858 and worked at the Montreal Star and the Toronto Mail (eventually merged with The Globe and Mail) before moving to Ottawa. Cook was also the Canadian correspondent for The Times, but was eventually dismissed because he was felt to be too partisan. He first served on city council in 1894.

He is buried in Beechwood Cemetery.

References

External links
 

Mayors of Ottawa
1858 births
1943 deaths
English emigrants to Canada
Politicians from Leeds